Mid Norfolk is a constituency represented in the House of Commons of the UK Parliament since 2010 by George Freeman, a Conservative.

History 
Under the Redistribution of Seats Act 1885, the three two-member county divisions of Norfolk were replaced with six single-member divisions, including the newly created Mid Division of Norfolk. It was abolished at the next redistribution of seats under the provisions of the Representation of the People Act 1918, when it was absorbed by neighbouring constituencies.

The seat was re-established as a County Constituency for the 1983 general election, since which it has only elected and been served by a Conservative MP.

The Boundary Commission's Fifth Periodic Review of Westminster constituencies for the 2010 general election created a new constituency, Broadland, based on the local government district of the same name, which was formed from the majority of the Mid Norfolk seat, together with parts of North Norfolk. The Mid Norfolk seat was retained with substantially altered boundaries, gaining parts of South Norfolk and South West Norfolk in compensation (see below). The former MP for Mid Norfolk, Keith Simpson, was selected to contest the newly created Broadland constituency.

Boundaries and boundary changes

1885–1918: The Sessional Divisions of Forehoes, Guiltcross and Shropham, and Mitford and Launditch.

The constituency was created from parts of the Southern Division of Norfolk and parts of the abolished Eastern Division. The main settlements were East Dereham and Wymondham. On abolition, southern areas, including Wymondham, were returned to the Southern Division and northern areas, including East Dereham, were transferred to the South-Western Division.

1983–1997: The District of Breckland wards of Beetley and Gressenhall, East Dereham Neatherd, East Dereham St Withburga, East Dereham Toftwood, East Dereham Town, Eynsford, Hermitage, Launditch, Mattishall, Shipworth, Springvale, Swanton Morley, Taverner, Two Rivers, Upper Wensum, and Upper Yare, and the District of Broadland wards of Acle, Aylsham, Blofield, Brundall, Burlingham, Buxton, Cawston, Coltishall, Drayton, Foulsham, Freethorpe, Great Witchingham, Hainford, Hevingham, Horsford, Plumstead, Rackheath, Reedham, Reepham, South Walsham, Spixworth, St Faiths, Taverham, and Wroxham.

Eastern areas were transferred from Yarmouth, central areas (including Aylsham) from North Norfolk and western areas (including East Dereham) from South West Norfolk.

1997–2010: The District of Breckland wards of Beetley and Gressenhall, East Dereham Neatherd, East Dereham St Withburga, East Dereham Toftwood, East Dereham Town, Eynsford, Hermitage, Launditch, Mattishall, Shipworth, Springvale, Swanton Morley, Taverner, Two Rivers, Upper Wensum, and Upper Yare, and the District of Broadland wards of Acle, Aylsham, Blofield, Brundall, Burlingham, Buxton, Cawston, Coltishall, Foulsham, Freethorpe, Great Witchingham, Hainford, Hevingham, Horsford, Plumstead, Rackheath, Reedham, Reepham, South Walsham, Spixworth, St Faiths, and Wroxham.

The District of Broadland wards of Drayton and Teversham were transferred to Norwich North.

2010–present: The District of Breckland wards of All Saints, Buckenham, Burgh and Haverscroft, Dereham Central, Dereham Humbletoft, Dereham Neatherd, Dereham Toftwood, Eynsford, Haggard De Toni, Hermitage, Launditch, Necton, Queen's, Shipdham, Springvale and Scarning, Swanton Morley, Taverner, Templar, Two Rivers, Upper Wensum, Upper Yare, Watton, and Wissey, and the District of South Norfolk wards of Abbey, Cromwells, Hingham and Deopham, Northfields, Rustens, Town, and Wicklewood.

Significant changes, with only the District of Breckland wards retained.  The District of Broadland wards, which had comprised the majority of the constituency, were included in the new County Constituency of Broadland.  Further District of Breckland wards, including Watton and Attleborough, were transferred from South West Norfolk.  The District of South Norfolk wards, including Wymondham, were transferred from the constituency of South Norfolk.

Members of Parliament

MPs 1885–1918

MPs since 1983

Elections

Elections in the 2010s

Elections in the 2000s

Elections in the 1990s

Elections in the 1980s

Elections in the 1910s

General Election 1914–15:

Another General Election was required to take place before the end of 1915. The political parties had been making preparations for an election to take place and by July 1914, the following candidates had been selected; 
Unionist: William Lewis Boyle
Liberal: David Waterlow

Elections in the 1900s

Elections in the 1890s

Elections in the 1880s

See also
List of parliamentary constituencies in Norfolk

Notes

References

Parliamentary constituencies in Norfolk
Constituencies of the Parliament of the United Kingdom established in 1885
Constituencies of the Parliament of the United Kingdom disestablished in 1918
Constituencies of the Parliament of the United Kingdom established in 1983